Andrew Lawson (born 2 March 1993) is a Grand Prix motorcycle racer from Australia.

Career statistics

By season

Races by year

References

External links
 Profile on motogp.com

Australian motorcycle racers
Living people
1993 births
125cc World Championship riders